Peter Paige (born June 20, 1969) is an American actor, director and screenwriter. He is best known for his portrayal of Emmet Honeycutt in the gay drama Queer as Folk. His debut as director and writer was on the film Say Uncle.

Early life and education
Paige was born in West Hartford, Connecticut. He graduated from Boston University School of Theatre with a Bachelor of Fine Arts degree summa cum laude.

Career
Best known for his role as Emmett Honeycutt on Showtime's hit series Queer as Folk, Paige's other television credits include Will & Grace, Time of Your Life, Girlfriends, Caroline in the City, American Dad!, Related, Grey's Anatomy, The Closer and Without a Trace. His first audition in Los Angeles earned him a guest-starring role on Suddenly Susan.

Paige spent summer 2004 starring in his feature directorial debut, Say Uncle, alongside Kathy Najimy, Anthony Clark, Melanie Lynskey, Lisa Edelstein and Gabrielle Union. Other film credits include Don McKellar's Childstar with Jennifer Jason Leigh and Dave Foley, Showtime's Our America (which debuted at Sundance in 2002), indie Pop and the award-winning shorts The Four of Us and The Shooting.

An accomplished stage actor, Paige has appeared at major regional theatres throughout the country, most notably in world premieres at La Jolla Playhouse, Portland Center Stage, and Playwrights Horizons. He has performed nearly every genre of play, from the Greeks to Shakespeare to contemporary American work. Plays on his resume include A Midsummer Night's Dream, The Rivals, Secret Agents, You're a Good Man, Charlie Brown and Pantophobia, his two-man show written and performed with Abraham Higginbotham.

On February 6, 2013, it was announced that The Fosters, a show that Paige created along with Bradley Bredeweg, and produced by Jennifer Lopez and through production company, Nuyorican Productions was picked up by the ABC Family. The series follows the lives of the Foster family, an interracial lesbian couple who are married and raising biological and adoptive children together. The series began airing on June 3, 2013. On January 10, 2017, the network announced a fifth season was picked up.

In 2020, Paige made a guest appearance on Station 19 (a spin-off of Grey's Anatomy).

In 2019, Paige wrote and directed the television film The Thing About Harry, which premiered on Freeform in 2020.

Personal life
Paige is gay.

Filmography

Film

Television

Music videos

Stage

Off Broadway (partial credits)
 High Concepts (with Robert Sean Leonard) --- Malaparte --- John Ruocco
 Somebody --- Playwrights Horizon --- Yana Landowne
 Eastern Standard --- Equator --- Easley
 Landscape of the Body --- Judith Anderson --- Lisa Goldsmith
 Tartuffe --- Biggs/Rosatti --- Alison Laslett

Regional
 The History Boys --- The Ahmanson Theatre --- Tom Irwin
 Eden Lane (World Premiere) --- La Jolla Playhouse --- Des McAnuff
 A Midsummer Night's Dream --- Portland Center Stage --- Elizabeth Huddle
 Pantophobia --- HBO Workspace --- Luke Yankee
 Twisted --- The Lex --- Jesse Carmichael
 The Rivals --- Portland Center Stage --- Elizabeth Huddle
 Blue Window --- Edinburgh Theatre Festival --- Richard Seer/Eve Muson
 Secret Agents (Premiere) --- Artemis Productions --- Beth Harper
 You're A Good Man, Charlie Brown --- Charles Playhouse --- John Ruocco
 Twelfth Night --- Huntington Theatre --- Robert Morgan

References

External links
 
 

1969 births
Living people
American male film actors
American male stage actors
American male television actors
LGBT film directors
LGBT television directors
American gay actors
LGBT people from Connecticut
Boston University College of Fine Arts alumni
Male actors from Connecticut
People from West Hartford, Connecticut
Film directors from Connecticut